Khamaj is a Hindustani classical Music raga within the Khamaj thaat which is named after it.

Many ghazals and thumris are based on Khamaj. It utilises the shuddha (pure) form of Ni on the ascent, and the komala (flat) form of Ni on the descent, creating a key asymmetry in compositional and improvisational performance. This raga has been explored more in the lighter forms of Hindustani Classical Music such as Thumri, Tappa etc. Yet a many compositions in Dhrupad and Khayal are found as well. Harikambhoji is the equivalent rāgam in Carnatic music.

Theory [Raag Shashtra]

Arohana: 

Avroha: 

Vadi Swar: 

Samavadi Swar:

Compositions

In Dhrupad, Sadra, Khayal, Thumri & Tappa styles :

Sudhi Bisara Gayi...(Sadra form – in 10 beat cycle of Jhaptal. Sung by Abdul Karim Khan of Kirana Gharana)
"Ban Ban Dhunda liyo banvari......"(Set in TeenTal, composed by Acharya Dr Pandit Gokulotsavji Maharaj)
"nand ghar aaj baje badhai......"(Set in TeenTal, composed by Acharya Dr Pandit Gokulotsavji Maharaj)
Piya Tori Tirchhi Najar Laage Pyaari Re... (Bol Banav Ki Thumri form. Sung by Faiyaz Khan of Agra Gharana)
Koyaliyan Kuhuk/Kook Sunaave... (Khayal/Bandishi Thumri form – in 16 beat cycle of Teentala. Sung by Nisar Hussain Khan of Rampur Gharana, Ajoy Chakrabarty of Patiala Gharana
Shyaam Rang Daari... (Dhrupad form – in 14 beat cycle of Dhamar Tala. Sung by N. Zahiruddin Dagar & F. Wasfuddin Dagar)
Ab Maan Jao Saiyaan...(Dadra) sung by Ustad Ghulam Abbas Khan of Rampur Sahaswan Gharana
Sudh Naa Lini Jabse Gaye... (Dadra form – Sung by Faiyaz Khan of Agra Gharana and also Mentioned in Vishnu Narayan Bhatkhande's Kramik Pustak Malika Vol. 2)

Hindi Film Songs based on Raga Khamaj:

 Bada natkhat hai...ka kare yashoda maiya,  "Kuchh Toh Log Kahenge" and Raina Beet Jaye (with Todi in mukhara) – Amar Prem
 Ayo kahanse ghanashyam – Buddha Mil Gaya
 Vo na aenge palatkar – Devdaas
 A dilse dil mila le – Navrang
 Dhal chuki shame Gam – Kohinoor
 Khat likha de savariyake nam babu
 Mere to giridharagopala – Meera
 Tere bina sajna lage na jiya hamar – Aarti
 Tere mere milan ki ye raina – Abhimaan
 Khamaj – Fuzön sung by Shafqat Amanat Ali
 Mitwa – Kabhi alvida na kehna

The Narsinh Bhajan "Vaishnav jan to" is also based on Khamaj.

The Sargam Geet is as follows: set to teentaal, that is sixteen beats:

This is the Prelude to the Sargam Geet, the underscore signifies the avagraha i.e. prolongation of the immediate previous note by one beat for one _ and three beats in case of _ _ _

Film Songs

Language:Tamil

Notes

Notable songs
Kuch To Log Kahenge
Tere Mere Milan Ki Ye Raina
Mora Saiyyan Mose Bole
Vaishnava Jana To(in Mishra Khamaj)

References

Sources
 
 
 http://www.tanarang.com/english/khamaj_eng.htm
 https://www.parrikar.org/hindustani/khamaj/

External links
 More details about raga Khamaj

Hindustani ragas